The Windsor Institute was a school in Hampton, New Hampshire, United States. It was owned and operated by Michael Dunbar, where five-day courses in Windsor chairmaking were taught year round.  The school had its final class, an 'Early Philadelphia High Back Arm Chair', in March of 2016.

Students 

Many students, from accomplished woodworkers to those who have never used a hammer, have come from Great Britain, Korea, Argentina, Canada, Australia and many other countries, as well as from all parts of the United States, to study at the Windsor Institute.  Students' country flags are flown outside the main shop during the course, and later displayed inside, in tribute to this internationalism. 

Beginning students learned the basics of Windsor chairmaking in the Sack Back course, which prepared them for advanced classes.

Chairmaker's Hall of Fame 

The Chairmaker's Hall of Fame at the Windsor Institute recognizes those students who have improved on methods taught in the class or have created new methods altogether.   Humorous names for these new inventions, such as the No-Name Stick, the Shot In The Back, and the VanHovenometer, contribute to the light-hearted atmosphere of the shop.

External links
 The Windsor Institute
 Making a Windsor Chair with Michael Dunbar, by John Aniano.
 Building a Windsor chair with Mike Dunbar, by Michael Tulloch.

Chairs
Education in Rockingham County, New Hampshire
Education in New Hampshire